The 2004 Samoa National League, or also known as the Upolo First Division, was the 16th edition of the Samoa National League, the top league of the Football Federation Samoa. Strickland Brothers Lepea won their third consecutive title.

Standings

References 

Samoa National League seasons
Samoa
football